William MacColin Kirkpatrick (10 December 1878 – 3 December 1953) was an English Conservative Party politician. He was elected as Member of Parliament (MP) for Preston at the 1931 general election, and held the seat until his resignation in 1936 when he was appointed as the representative to China of the Export Credits Guarantee Department.

Sources

External links 
 

1878 births
1953 deaths
Conservative Party (UK) MPs for English constituencies
UK MPs 1931–1935
UK MPs 1935–1945